Mungaul is a small village in Jagdishpur block of Bhojpur district in Bihar, India. As of 2011, its population was 504, in 94 households. It is located east of the city of Jagdishpur.

References 

Villages in Bhojpur district, India